Krokodeilos Kladas (1425–1490), also known as Korkodeilos, Krokondeilos, or Korkondelos, was a military leader from the Peloponnese who fought against the Ottomans on behalf of the Republic of Venice during the late 15th century.

Biography

Krokodeilos Kladas was born in Koroni in 1425. His father was the military chief Theodore Kladas.

When the Ottoman Sultan Mehmed II (r. 1444–1446 and 1451–1481) took the Morea in 1460, Kladas handed over his castle of Saint George (Agios Giorgios) and was given in exchange the castle of Vardounia in Upper Mani and the territory of Elos. By 1465, the Kladas brothers, Krokodeilos and Epifani, were leading bands of stratioti (warrior bands) on behalf of Venice against the Turks. They put Vardounia and their lands into Venetian possession, for which Epifani then acted as governor. The Kladas brothers were frequently complimented by Venetian officials, and received generous Venetian gifts. Krokodeilos Kladas and his followers stood as rebels against Mehmed, but the Venetian-Ottoman peace settlement, while giving them a full pardon, also returned territorial boundaries to what they had been in 1463, so this put the Venetian-Kladas land holdings back into Ottoman possession. Kladas moved to Venetian-held Koroni.

On October 9, 1480, Kladas led stratioti from Koroni to attack Ottoman holdings in Mani. A group of Albanian insurgents led by Kladas became a matter of dispute between the Ottomans and Venetians in the Morea on the issue of responsibility about damage caused by them. Both the Ottomans and the Venetians put a price on his head; the latter, specifically, "put a bounty of 10,000 hyperpyrai from the mint of Methone on Kladas' head." This revolt was joined in December by stratioti from Nafplion led by Theodore Bua and Mexas Bozikis. An army sent by the Sultan was defeated between Passavas and Oitylo in February 1481. Later that month, a larger force under Mohammed Bey drove Kladas to Porto Kagio where he was taken on board a Neapolitan galley, leaving his revolt to wither in his absence. A peaceful settlement of the revolt was negotiated by the Ottoman governor of the Morea and Venetian official Bartolomeo Minio. Meanwhile, Kladas went with a Neapolitan army to Albania to aid an anti-Ottoman revolt there. It is not known when he returned to Mani. He was captured in battle near Monemvasia in 1490 and flayed alive.

Family
The Kladas family is known in records from the Morea since 1296, when a "Corcondille" managed to capture a Frankish-held castle for the Byzantines. According to one view – initially proposed by Constantine Sathas – the family had migrated from Epirus to Peloponnese; but this isn't based on any evidence. More recent extensive research shows that Kladas was a Byzantine family, that was most likely of turcopole ultimate origin. The family can be traced back to a group, composed of the descendants and soldiers of Kaykaus II (sultan of the Sultanate of Rum who was deposed in 1262), who acted as mercenaries (turcopoles) in the troops of Michael VIII and Andronikos II Palaiologos. It came to the Peloponnese at the beginning of 1263, as part of the army of sebastokrator Constantine Palaiologos, in order to face the Franks (Principality of Achaea) in the war of 1263-1264. After the war, it received lands and was fully integrated in the Byzantine society of the Morean Despotate, through alliances and marriages made with local archontes, to the point that it managed to gain possession of extensive pieces of land with paroikoi settled there. Because of the power it had amassed, we see its members as privileged interlocutors of the Venetians, after the fall of the Despotate to the Ottomans.

Members of the family made donations to a monastery at Mystras in 1366 and 1375. A Krokodeilos is identified as one of the rebels against the Emperor Manuel II in 1415. The "Crocodile" pun made there is a single appearance and never appears in contemporary documents relating to this Krokodeilos Kladas. The carved inscription on a donation to a church in Karytaina with the name transliterated as "Krokontēlos" is probably not related to him, and the carving is dated to the mid-14th century. He and his brothers are strongly praised in Venetian sources. Kladas had been awarded a Venetian knighthood (and a gold robe) just before the 1480 revolt. Members of the family moved to Kefalonia and continued to lead stratioti in Venetian service for at least another hundred years.

References

Citations

Sources

Further reading

1425 births
1490 deaths
Ottoman Peloponnese
Mani Peninsula
People executed by flaying
Republic of Venice military personnel
Stratioti
Byzantine people of the Byzantine–Ottoman wars
People from Koroni